Alfred Gillow (2 May 1835 – 12 August 1897) was an English farmer and amateur cricketer. He was born at St Nicholas-at-Wade in Kent in 1835 and played four first-class cricket matches for Kent County Cricket Club and the amateur Gentlemen of Kent side in 1859 and 1860.

Gillow made his first-class debut against the Gentlemen of England at Lord's in 1859 before making three further first-class appearances in 1860, two for Kentand one for the Gentlemen of Kent. He was educated at The King's School, Canterbury and played local cricket for Sandwich Town Cricket Club. As well as his first-class appearances, Gillow played in a number of non-first-class matches for the Gentlemen of Kent.

Gillow farmed at St Nicholas at Wade on the Isle of Thanet in Kent. He married Eliza Emmerson, granddaughter of Admiral Edward Harvey, in 1863; the couple had one daughter but Eliza had died by the 1871 census. Gillow died at Chartham in Kent in August 1897 aged 62.

References

External links

1835 births
1897 deaths
People from Thanet (district)
English cricketers
Kent cricketers
Gentlemen of Kent cricketers